Bernard McElligott was a Gaelic footballer and hurler from Abbeydorney in North County Kerry, Ireland. He played football with Brick Rangers and hurling with Abbeydorney. He also played with football and hurling with Kerry, in fact he is the last player to play in both the Munster Senior Hurling and Football Championships in the same year in the early 1990s.

References

 Niall Flynn's 36 and Counting
 https://web.archive.org/web/20090619122113/http://munster.gaa.ie/winning-teams/u21f_teams/

Year of birth missing (living people)
Living people
Dual players
Abbeydorney hurlers
Brick Rangers Gaelic footballers
Kerry inter-county Gaelic footballers
Kerry inter-county hurlers